Nairobi Academy is a preparatory and secondary school located in the Karen suburb of Nairobi, Kenya.

Establishment
The school was founded by educationist Frank Bentley in 1976.

Operations
The school caters to ages 2–19 (both boys and girls) and follows the English National Curriculum leading students to take International General Certificate of Secondary Education and A-Level at 16+ and 18+, respectively. Students take examinations through both the Cambridge International Examinations and the Edexcel Boards.

See also

 Education in Kenya
 List of schools in Kenya

References

External links
 , the school's official website

1976 establishments in Kenya
Educational institutions established in 1976
Schools in Nairobi
High schools and secondary schools in Kenya